is a city located in Akita Prefecture, Japan. , the city had an estimated population of 24,291 in 9,371 households, and a population density of 100 persons per km².

Geography
Nikaho is located at the far southwest corner of Akita Prefecture, bordered by the Sea of Japan to the west, and by Yamagata Prefecture to the south. Part of the city is within the borders of the Chōkai Quasi-National Park.

Neighboring municipalities
Akita Prefecture
Yurihonjō
Yamagata Prefecture
Yuza

Climate
Nikaho has a Humid subtropical climate (Köppen climate classification Cfa) with large seasonal temperature differences, with warm to hot (and often humid) summers and cold (sometimes severely cold) winters. Precipitation is significant throughout the year, but is heaviest from August to October. The average annual temperature in Nikaho is 13.0 °C. The average annual rainfall is 1877 mm with September as the wettest month. The temperatures are highest on average in August, at around 24.4 °C, and lowest in January, at around -0.9 °C.

Demographics
Per Japanese census data, the population of Nikaho has been declining over the past 30 years.

History
The area of present-day Nikaho was part of ancient Ugo Province, dominated by the Satake clan during the Edo period, who ruled Kubota Domain under the Tokugawa shogunate. After the start of the Meiji period, it became part of Yuri District, Akita Prefecture in 1878 with the establishment of the modern municipalities system. The village of Hirasawa was established on April 1, 1889 and was raised to town status on June 4, 1902. After merging with the villages of Koide and Innai on March 31, 1955 it was renamed Nikaho town.

The city of Nikaho was established on October 1, 2005, from the merger of Nikaho, with the neighboring the towns of Kisakata and Konoura.

Government
Nikaho has a mayor-council form of government with a directly elected mayor and a unicameral city legislature of 18 members. The city contributes one member to the Akita Prefectural Assembly.  In terms of national politics, the city is part of Aichi District 3 of the lower house of the Diet of Japan.

Economy

The economy of Nikaho is based on commercial fishing and agriculture. Industry includes a large factory by the electronics firm TDK.

Education
Nikaho has four public elementary schools and three public junior high schools operated by the city government, and one public high schools operated by the Akita Prefectural Board of Education.

Transportation

Railway
 East Japan Railway Company - Uetsu Main Line
  -  -  -  -

Highway

Local attractions 

a thousand-year old temple in the south of Nikaho which was made famous by the haiku poet Matsuo Bashō's visit to the area in 1689. He wrote of the temple in his Oku no Hosomichi.

a collection of clumps of land which used to be small islands until a major earthquake in 1804 submerged the sea around them. They were often compared to the similar small islands on the Pacific coast of Matsushima.
, 
waterfall that is a National Place of Scenic Beauty .

a long stretch of sandy beach in the south of Nikaho.

An onsen (hot spring) located in the Nemunooka Roadside Station. The hot spring offers views of the Japan Sea coast.

a children's museum in the north of Nikaho with many interactive exhibits which explores the different uses of ferrite.

a memorial museum which focuses on the Antarctic Expedition by local explorer Shirase Nobu and includes a replica of Shirase's ship.

a museum full of information and exhibits about the company TDK. TDK was founded by a local man Kenzō Saitō and there are many TDK factories and suppliers in the area.
TDK Akita General Sports Center
a group of sports facilities

Parks in Nikaho 

a park surrounding a lake and ringed with cherry trees. It is especially attractive in late April and early May when the cherry trees start to bloom.

a park in the foothills of Mount Chokai with a small lake, cherry trees and hydrangeas.

a park which snakes along the coast on the border of Yamagata and Akita Prefectures.

a plateau in the foothills of Mount Chokai with splendid views of the area.

Local events 
Fireworks
A fireworks festival is held each year over three nights in each of the former towns of Nikaho City.

This religious event takes place in February in which cod are carried from the Konoura fishing port to a local Shinto shrine.

one of the top triathlon events in the Japanese calendar.

a mountain bike race around the base of Mount Chōkai.

Mount Chōkai
Mount Chōkai is an inactive volcano which stands alone on the border between Akita Prefecture and Yamagata Prefecture. It is 2236 metres high and is the second highest mountain in the Tōhoku area. It is popular with skiers, hikers and climbers.

There are two main trails for climbing Mount Chōkai from the Akita side. One trailhead is in Yurihonjō, Akita, north of Nikaho. The other, in Nikaho, starts at the Nakajima parking area. A one-way hike from the Nakajima commonly takes 4 hours and offers outstanding views of the Japan Sea coast and the lush greenery of the Nikaho area.

Local crafts, arts, and food 
 Sake (rice wine)
There is one independent sake brewery in Nikaho: 

a local sushi of raw hatahata fish.
Oysters & abalone
the coastline of Nikaho is renowned for its oysters and abalone.
 Karintō
a local brown sugar-coated candy.

a superhero character which was born in Nikaho.

Sister city relations
 Shawnee, Oklahoma, USA
 Anacortes, Washington
 Zhuji, Zhejiang, China  friendship city since October 23, 2008

Noted people from Nikaho
, Antarctic explorer who led an expedition to the South Pole in 1910.
, founder of TDK.
, mangaka.

Notes

External links

Official Website 

 
Cities in Akita Prefecture
Populated coastal places in Japan